The Church of Our Lady of the Miraculous Medal was a Roman Catholic parish, a part of the Roman Catholic Archdiocese of New York.

The church was located at 114th Street and 7th Avenue in Manhattan, New York City. The parish was established in 1927 to serve the Spanish-speaking community of upper Manhattan and the Bronx. It was the second parish established in the Archdiocese to serve this growing population, the first being the Church of Our Lady of Guadalupe in Greenwich Village. It was staffed by Vincentian Fathers from Spain.

The parish was closed in the 1980s.

References 

Christian organizations established in 1927
Closed churches in the Roman Catholic Archdiocese of New York
Closed churches in New York City
Roman Catholic churches in Manhattan
Roman Catholic churches completed in 1927
Spanish-American culture in New York City
20th-century Roman Catholic church buildings in the United States